Ucom is a mobile network operator and internet service provider

History
Ucom was founded in 2009. The goal of the company was to provide customers with access to innovative technological solutions in its field. Ucom was the first telecommunications company in Armenia to introduce the "fiber-optics to the home" solution, which provides high-quality television (IPTV), high-speed Internet connection and digital telephone services. Ucom provides its Internet services through its own fiber-optic channel connecting Armenia with Georgia. This allows the company to provide transit internet to the Middle East.

In 2013, the company received a license to provide public mobile internet services, and in 2015 acquired a 100% stake in Orange Armenia, thus entering the Armenian mobile market. Following this, the company launched the 4G+ network in Armenia, which acted as a supplement to the company's combined services, providing customers with the complete "4 in 1" package of IPTV, fixed and mobile phone services, and internet service.

In 2017, during the Customer Advisory Board meeting that took place in San Francisco at the initiative of Calix, Ucom and Calix announced the introduction of NG-PON2 (New Generation Passive Optical Network) technology in Armenia, which would enable Ucom to upgrade the bandwidth speed from 1 gigabit/sec in its fixed network to 10 gigabits/sec through this state-of-the-art infrastructure. With the construction of the NG-PON2 network, it was possible to provide higher quality services, speed, security and new services.

In April 2017, Ucom and FORA-BANK Joint-Stock Commercial Bank (part of Tashir Group) signed a partnership agreement for projects including the full range of telecommunications services, covering the entire territory of Armenia as well as its most remote regions. The implementation of the investment program defined by the agreement allowed expanding 4Play offers and 4G+ network in the country. Future plans include expansion of operations, especially in Russia, which would allow Ucom to become a leading pan-Armenian telecommunications operator. 

Ucom has also been active in the field of corporate social responsibility, implementing a number of programs aimed at the development of children, particularly in the sphere of education. With the support of the company, computer engineering laboratories were opened in some Armenian schools, promoting the development of the ICT sector. The company also supports vulnerable groups in society by continuing to implement the "Let's Keep Children in Families" SMS charity project, which provides families with resources that allow parents to create a stable source of income and release their children from the care of state institutions. The company also implements the "Bringing Sight to Armenian Eyes" program, within the framework of which quality ophthalmological services are provided to the regional residents of Armenia free of charge.

Labour strike
On April 9, 2020, a publication with the title "BREAKING. Ucom management staff resign" appeared in the press and quickly spread throughout the Armenian network. According to the publication, the entire management of Ucom as well as the entire technical staff (around five dozen) had resigned.

Cause of controversy 
According to several media reports, the controversy was caused by a confrontation between Ucom's 3.17% shareholder and at the time Director General Hayk Yesayan and the rest of the Ucom shareholders, the complete and detailed list of which is publicly available since 2019 via Ucom Prospectus.

At the Board of Directors’ meeting held on April 14, 2020 the head of the executive organ was changed 1, and Ara Sergei Khachatryan was appointed Director General. He was registered as Director at “Ucom” CJSC in the Agency of the State Register of Legal Entities of the RA Ministry of Justice. 

No quantitative changes have taken place both in the shares and shareholders of “Ucom” CJSC. Around 500 employees including top and mid-level management of the “Ucom” CJSC submitted dismissal applications, but at the crisis management skills and efforts of the newly appointed Director General, most of staff returned to regular execution of their job responsibilities.

Further developments 

Hayk and Alexander Yesayan announced that they have no intention to sell their share of the company and have intentions to purchase the other 94% of the company shares, for which they offered around USD 17 million. The Board of Directors did not respond to the offer. 

As of May 14, 2020, 1160 Ucom employees kept on ensuring company’s regular operations as far as in addition to their duties they have temporarily taken over the functions of the colleagues resigned. In total, 520 employees specialized in different areas have resigned as per their own application, the retention process for many of them was underway at the time. Business processes were optimized, the preference was given to the internal resources and employees were promoted internally while being entrusted the positions of the heads of various departments, senior specialists and coordinators.2

Ucom Foundation 
The Ucom Foundation was established in 2016 as the main implementing body of Ucom's philanthropic and humanitarian programs. The mission of the foundation is to help vulnerable social groups in Armenia and improve people's lives by: creating sources of stable income, reuniting families, supporting the formation of a stable and secure society, educating a healthy and developed generation, and creating opportunities for further development. The Ucom Foundation supports the implementation of charitable programs in the fields of health, education and culture.

Staff

Current 
 Gurgen Khachatryan – Chairman of the Board of Directors
 Ralph Yirikian – Director General 
 Arina Arustamyan - Commercial Director

Previous 
 Hayk Yesayan – Director General
 Alexandr Yesayan – Deputy Director General, Head of Development
 Aram Barseghyan – Commercial Director
 Karen Shaboyan – Head of Sales

References 

Internet service providers of Armenia
Telecommunications companies of Armenia
Armenian companies established in 2009
Telecommunications companies established in 2009